Julie Menin (born October 6, 1967) is a member of the New York City Council from District 5. Before she was elected to this position, she served as an American attorney, civil servant, non-profit executive, professor and small business owner. In January 2019, she was appointed Director of the Census for NYC and Executive Assistant Corporation Counsel for Strategic Advocacy. Previously, she had worked as the Commissioner of the New York City Mayor's Office of Media and Entertainment and Commissioner of New York City's Department of Consumer Affairs.

Early life and education
Menin is the daughter of Agnes and Robert Jacobs. Her mother was a painter and her father a radiologist. Menin earned a Bachelor of Arts Degree magna cum laude from Columbia University and received her Juris Doctor from Northwestern University School of Law.

Career 
Menin began her career in 1992 as a regulatory attorney at Wiley, Rein & Fielding in Washington D.C., where she represented clients in matters involving federal and state enforcement agencies. She later became Senior Regulatory Attorney at Colgate-Palmolive in New York City, where she played a lead role in numerous agency cases involving the Department of Justice, the Environmental Protection Agency, and the Federal Trade Commission, and also litigated disputes in state and federal courts. In 1999, she opened and operated Vine, a restaurant, market, and catering operation in lower Manhattan with more than 75 employees.

Rising 
Following 9/11, Menin founded and was the president of the nonprofit Wall Street Rising, which worked for the recovery of the downtown neighborhood. She helped small businesses access grants, insurance, and other monetary aid; grew the organization to 30,000 members; and created a variety of programs, including the Retail Attraction Program, which helped more than 600 small businesses stay in lower Manhattan.

Under her leadership, the organization launched the "Music Downtown" and "Art Downtown" series, which provided cultural and entertainment amenities to local residents in an effort to revitalize Lower Manhattan. Menin worked with artists including Mikhail Baryshnikov on these programs.

Manhattan Community Board 1 
Beginning in 2005, Menin served as Chairperson for Manhattan Community Board 1, where she was unanimously elected for three consecutive terms totaling seven years. 

As chair of CB1, Menin worked on numerous land use and zoning issues, led a successful campaign to build New York City's first "green" school and other initiatives to revitalize Lower Manhattan. Menin has been recognized for her "solution-based" approach to controversial issues in the wake of 9/11 and as chair of CB1.

She successfully pushed to move the trial of 9-11 mastermind Khalid Sheik Mohammed out of Lower Manhattan, while maintaining the importance of a federal trial. resulting in the Obama Administration backing out of New York City 

On May 25, 2010, Menin presided over the Community Board's 29-1 vote in favor of a proposed Islamic cultural center and mosque, where she urged that an interfaith center (where all different religions can worship) be part of the plans.

In 2011, Menin was praised for her efforts to balance the rights of Occupy Wall Street protesters with quality-of-life concerns of residents.

2013 Manhattan Borough president election 
Menin ran in the Democratic primary for Manhattan Borough President in September 2013, and finished fourth behind New York City Council Members Gale Brewer, Jessica Lappin and Robert Jackson.

In 2017, Menin agreed to a $201,000 settlement with the New York City Campaign Finance Board. The settlement covered funds that had remained in her campaign finance account after the 2013 election and by law had to be returned to the Board since they had not been spent.

Commissioner of DCA 
Under Menin's leadership, the New York City Department of Consumer Affairs has launched initiatives to protect consumers from fraud, scams, and predatory conduct, and expanded the Agency's role in areas such as financial empowerment and investigative legal enforcement. DCA has increased its consumer restitution by 72 percent over the prior year, returning money to consumers who have been victims of fraud, scams and predatory conduct. At DCA she also implemented New York City's paid sick leave law and launched a new Earned Income Tax Credit initiative that resulted in over $250 million being returned to low-income New Yorkers.

Mayor's Office of Media and Entertainment

In February 2016, Menin was appointed Commissioner of The Mayor's Office of Media and Entertainment, an agency that comprises the Office of Film, Theatre and Broadcasting and NYC Media. The Office of Film, Theatre and Broadcasting serves as a one-stop shop for the entertainment industry, a sector that contributes nearly $9 billion to the City of New York's economy and employs over 130,000 New Yorkers. NYC Media is responsible for managing and programming all of the media assets for the City of New York, which includes a television broadcast network reaching over 18 million people, a radio station and four local cable stations. The agency has seen record growth in both film projects and television series produced in the city. She negotiated the deal to bring the Grammy Awards back to New York after a 15 year absence, resulting in a $200 million benefit to New York City.

In 2016, the office launched a five-part initiative to support women both behind and in-front of the camera in film and television and in theater, the first of its kind for a U.S. city. That same year, Menin launched Made in NY Writers Room, a diversity initiative that awards fellowships and mentorship opportunities to traditionally under-represented television writers, and #NominateNYC, a campaign to increase diversity among the voting members of the Academy of Motion Picture Arts and Sciences. In an effort to reduce the carbon footprint of the film and television industry, Menin created NYC Film Green, an environmental initiative that promotes and recognizes sustainable practices on the sets of film and television productions.

Census for NYC 
In January 2019, Menin was announced as Director of the Census for NYC and Executive Assistant Corporation Counsel for Strategic Advocacy by Mayor Bill de Blasio. Menin is responsible for organizing New York City's efforts to have every resident to participate in the upcoming 2020 Census. Menin successfully advocated against the Trump administration's attempt to add a citizenship question to the 2020 census.

The Census results captured a gain of 629,000 residents for New York City as the City grew more in total population than any other city in America.

Columbia University
Menin is an adjunct professor at the School of International and Public Affairs, Columbia University. She served on the board of trustees of Columbia University.

Personal life
In 1999, she married Bruce Menin in a Jewish ceremony at the Metropolitan Club. She resides in Manhattan with her husband and four children.

References 

Living people
Lawyers from New York City
American women restaurateurs
American restaurateurs
20th-century American Jews
New York City Department of Consumer and Worker Protection
United States Census Bureau
New York City Council
Commissioners in New York City
1967 births
Activists from New York City
Columbia College (New York) alumni
Northwestern University Pritzker School of Law alumni
21st-century American Jews